Buckholz Corners is an unincorporated community located in the town of North Bend, Jackson County, Wisconsin, United States. The community was named for Christopher Buckholz, the site owner, who emigrated from Prussia in the 1850s.

Notes

Unincorporated communities in Jackson County, Wisconsin
Unincorporated communities in Wisconsin